Anna Marie Falcon (born September 17, 1982 in Las Piñas, Philippines), known by her stage name Francine Prieto is a Filipino actress, fashion model, radio DJ, and singer. She is Chinese Filipino of half Norwegian descent.

Education
Prieto studied B.S. Psychology at Adamson University but was unable to finish her degree when she joined show business.

Career

Prieto began her career in the entertainment industry as a member of That's Entertainment. In her teen years, she showed the makings of a high-profile model that got her into the modeling industry. At 13, she was fielded in the Elite Model Look Search Philippines 1994 (formerly Look of the Year) and she emerged as one of the finalists. Top model Linda Evangelista flew into Manila to judge the search.

A professional model at 14, she joined the Bodyshots Philippines competition and landed as 1st runner-up. It opened more doors for her in the modeling industry for years. Prieto represented the Philippines at the Miss South East Asia Peninsula International Pageant where she emerged as 2nd runner-up. In 2003, she was ventured into a major beauty contest, Binibining Pilipinas 2003 pageant. Unfortunately, although she did well in the competition, she only managed to reach the Top 12 finalists. Prieto screened as a candidate for Mutya ng Pilipinas 2003 but eventually dropped the plans after being offered exclusive starring roles contract by a then giant production outfit, Seiko Films. Prieto hold the record as 2 months from its first appearance from FHM Philippines as cover girl for November 2003.

As an actress, she did several sexy roles with Seiko Films together with Diana Zubiri. Her biggest break was when she played Queen Avria in Etheria, the second book of Encantadia. She has also done comic roles in Bubble Gang, where she was one of the mainstays. She recently played Kuran, a villainess in Kamandag. She also played a supporting role as Aureana in Codename: Asero. In early 2009, she played Sheila, one of the villains in Ang Babaeng Hinugot Sa Aking Tadyang.

As of 2012, she played Mrs. Smith in Kung Tayo'y Magkakalayo. Prieto terminated her contract with GMA-7. She has a contract with Kapamilya, although it is non-exclusive. In 2010, she played a vampire co-revolutionary leader Imelda Fontanilla, in the supernatural thriller series Imortal.

Also in 2010, Prieto became the model and face of Ever Bilena Cosmetics. Aside from being an actress, she was a radio presenter at DZMM TeleRadyo's program 'Ka-Date' together with Bobby Yan, which also aired on DZMM 630 simultaneously.

In 2016 Prieto returned in GMA Network and made a part in the teleserye entitled Oh, My Mama! last 2015.

Personal life
On March 26, 2010, Prieto's mother Amelia Falcon died at age 54 from ovarian cancer. Prieto has a paternal younger half-sister who lives in Norway, as well as a maternal older half-brother, and three more younger siblings from her stepfather.

Filmography

Television

Films

Radio

References

External links

Francine Prieto's original pictorials at FHM Philippines
Startalk: Francine Prieto speaks out

1982 births
Living people
Binibining Pilipinas contestants
Filipino child actresses
Filipino female models
Filipino film actresses
Filipino people of Chinese descent
Filipino people of Norwegian descent
Filipino radio personalities
Filipino television actresses
People from Las Piñas
That's Entertainment (Philippine TV series)
GMA Network personalities
Star Magic
ABS-CBN personalities
TV5 (Philippine TV network) personalities